Suzanna Arundhati Roy (born 24 November 1961) is an Indian author best known for her novel The God of Small Things (1997), which won the Booker Prize for Fiction in 1997 and became the best-selling book by a non-expatriate Indian author. She is also a political activist involved in human rights and environmental causes.

Early life 
Arundhati Roy was born in Shillong, Meghalaya, India, to Mary Roy, a Malayali Jacobite Syrian Christian women's rights activist from Kerala and Rajib Roy, a Bengali Hindu tea plantation manager from Calcutta. When she was two, her parents divorced and she returned to Kerala with her mother and brother. For some time, the family lived with Roy's maternal grandfather in Ooty, Tamil Nadu. When she was five, the family moved back to Kerala, where her mother started a school.

Roy attended school at Corpus Christi, Kottayam, followed by the Lawrence School, Lovedale, in Nilgiris, Tamil Nadu. She then studied architecture at the School of Planning and Architecture, Delhi, where she met architect Gerard da Cunha. They married in 1978 and lived together in Delhi, and then Goa, before they separated and divorced in 1982.

Personal life
Roy returned to Delhi, where she obtained a position with the National Institute of Urban Affairs. In 1984, she met independent filmmaker Pradip Krishen, who offered her a role as a goatherd in his award-winning movie Massey Sahib. They later married the same year. They collaborated on a television series about India's independence movement and two films, Annie and Electric Moon. Disenchanted with the film world, Roy experimented with various fields, including running aerobics classes. Roy and Krishen currently live separately but are still married. She became financially secure with the success of her novel The God of Small Things, published in 1997.

Roy is a cousin of prominent media personality Prannoy Roy, former head of the Indian television media group NDTV. She lives in Delhi.

Career

Early career: screenplays
Early in her career, Roy worked in television and movies. She wrote the screenplays for In Which Annie Gives It Those Ones (1989), a movie based on her experiences as a student of architecture, in which she also appeared as a performer, and Electric Moon (1992). Both were directed by her husband, Pradip Krishen, during their marriage. Roy won the National Film Award for Best Screenplay in 1988 for In Which Annie Gives It Those Ones. She attracted attention in 1994 when she criticised Shekhar Kapur's film Bandit Queen, which was based on the life of Phoolan Devi. In her film review titled "The Great Indian Rape Trick", she questioned the right to "restage the rape of a living woman without her permission", and charged Kapur with exploiting Devi and misrepresenting both her life and its meaning.

The God of Small Things

Roy began writing her first novel, The God of Small Things, in 1992, completing it in 1996. The book is semi-autobiographical and a major part captures her childhood experiences in Aymanam.

The publication of The God of Small Things catapulted Roy to international fame. It received the 1997 Booker Prize for Fiction and was listed as one of The New York Times Notable Books of the Year. It reached fourth position on The New York Times Bestsellers list for Independent Fiction. From the beginning, the book was also a commercial success: Roy received half a million pounds as an advance. It was published in May, and the book had been sold in 18 countries by the end of June.

The God of Small Things received stellar reviews in major American newspapers such as The New York Times (a "dazzling first novel," "extraordinary", "at once so morally strenuous and so imaginatively supple") and the Los Angeles Times ("a novel of poignancy and considerable sweep"), and in Canadian publications such as the Toronto Star ("a lush, magical novel"). It was one of the five best books of 1997 according to Time. Critical response in the United Kingdom was less positive, and the awarding of the Booker Prize caused controversy; Carmen Callil, a 1996 Booker Prize judge, called the novel "execrable", and The Guardian called the context "profoundly depressing". In India, the book was criticised especially for its unrestrained description of sexuality by E. K. Nayanar, then Chief Minister of Roy's home state Kerala, where she had to answer charges of obscenity.

Later career
Since the success of her novel, Roy has written a television serial, The Banyan Tree, and the documentary DAM/AGE: A Film with Arundhati Roy (2002).

In early 2007, Roy stated that she was working on a second novel, The Ministry of Utmost Happiness.

She contributed to We Are One: A Celebration of Tribal Peoples, a book released in 2009, that explores the culture of peoples around the world, portraying their diversity and the threats to their existence. The royalties from the sale of this book go to the indigenous rights organisation Survival International.

She has written numerous essays on contemporary politics and culture. In 2014, they were collected by Penguin India in a five-volume set. In 2019, her nonfiction was collected in a single volume, My Seditious Heart, published by Haymarket Books.

In October 2016, Penguin India and Hamish Hamilton UK announced that they would publish her second novel, The Ministry of Utmost Happiness, in June 2017. The novel was chosen for the Man Booker Prize 2017 Long List. The Ministry of Utmost Happiness was nominated as a finalist for the National Book Critics Circle Award for fiction in January 2018.

Advocacy
Since publishing The God of Small Things in 1997, Roy has spent most of her time on political activism and nonfiction (such as collections of essays about social causes). She is a spokesperson of the anti-globalization/alter-globalization movement and a vehement critic of neo-imperialism and U.S. foreign policy. She opposes India's policies toward nuclear weapons as well as industrialization and economic growth (which she describes as "encrypted with genocidal potential" in Listening to Grasshoppers: Field Notes on Democracy). She has also questioned the conduct of the Indian police and administration in the case of the 2001 Indian Parliament attack and the Batla House encounter case, contending that the country has had a "shadowy history of suspicious terror attacks, murky investigations, and fake encounters".

Support for Kashmiri separatism
In an August 2008 interview with The Times of India, Roy expressed her support for the independence of Kashmir from India after the massive demonstrations in 2008 in favour of independence took place—some 500,000 people rallied in Srinagar in the Kashmir part of Jammu and Kashmir state of India for independence on 18 August 2008, following the Amarnath land transfer controversy. According to her, the rallies were a sign that Kashmiris desired secession from India, and not union with India. She was criticised by the Indian National Congress and Bharatiya Janata Party for her remarks.

All India Congress Committee member and senior Congress party leader Satya Prakash Malaviya asked Roy to withdraw her "irresponsible" statement, saying it was "contrary to historical facts".
It would do better to brush up her knowledge of history and know that the princely state of Jammu and Kashmir had acceded to the Union of India after its erstwhile ruler Maharaja Hari Singh duly signed the Instrument of Accession on 26 October 1947. And the state, consequently has become as much an integral part of India as all the other erstwhile princely states have.  She was charged with sedition along with separatist Hurriyat leader Syed Ali Shah Geelani and others by Delhi Police for their "anti-India" speech at a 2010 convention on Kashmir: "Azadi: The Only Way".

Sardar Sarovar Project
Roy has campaigned along with activist Medha Patkar against the Narmada dam project, saying that the dam will displace half a million people with little or no compensation, and will not provide the projected irrigation, drinking water, and other benefits. Roy donated her Booker prize money, as well as royalties from her books on the project, to the Narmada Bachao Andolan. Roy also appears in Franny Armstrong's Drowned Out, a 2002 documentary about the project. Roy's opposition to the Narmada Dam project was criticised as "maligning Gujarat" by Congress and BJP leaders in Gujarat.

In 2002, Roy responded to a contempt notice issued against her by the Supreme Court of India with an affidavit saying the court's decision to initiate contempt proceedings based on an unsubstantiated and flawed petition, while refusing to inquire into allegations of corruption in military contracting deals pleading an overload of cases, indicated a "disquieting inclination" to silence criticism and dissent using the power of contempt. The court found Roy's statement, which she refused to disavow or apologise for, constituted criminal contempt, sentenced her to a "symbolic" one day's imprisonment, and fined her 2500. Roy served the jail sentence and paid the fine rather than serve an additional three months for default.

Environmental historian Ramachandra Guha has been critical of Roy's Narmada dam activism. While acknowledging her "courage and commitment" to the cause, Guha writes that her advocacy is hyperbolic and self-indulgent, "Ms. Roy's tendency to exaggerate and simplify, her Manichaean view of the world, and her shrill hectoring tone, have given a bad name to environmental analysis". He faulted Roy's criticism of Supreme Court judges who were hearing a petition brought by the Narmada Bachao Andolan as careless and irresponsible.

Roy counters that her writing is intentional in its passionate, hysterical tone: "I am hysterical. I'm screaming from the bloody rooftops. And he and his smug little club are going 'Shhhh... you'll wake the neighbours!' I want to wake the neighbours, that's my whole point. I want everybody to open their eyes".

Gail Omvedt and Roy have had fierce yet constructive discussions in open letters on Roy's strategy for the Narmada Dam movement. The activists disagree on whether to demand stopping the dam building altogether (Roy) or search for intermediate alternatives (Omvedt).

US foreign policy, war in Afghanistan

In an opinion piece in The Guardian titled "The Algebra of Infinite Justice", Roy responded to the U.S. military invasion of Afghanistan, finding fault with the argument that this war would be a retaliation for the September 11 attacks: "The bombing of Afghanistan is not revenge for New York and Washington. It is yet another act of terror against the people of the world." According to her, U.S. president George W. Bush and UK prime minister Tony Blair were guilty of Orwellian doublethink: 
When he announced the air strikes, President George Bush said: "We're a peaceful nation." America's favourite ambassador, Tony Blair, (who also holds the portfolio of prime minister of the UK), echoed him: "We're a peaceful people." So now we know. Pigs are horses. Girls are boys. War is peace. She disputes U.S. claims of being a peaceful and freedom-loving nation, listing China and 19 Third World "countries that America has been at war with—and bombed—since World War II ", as well as previous U.S. support for the Taliban movement and the Northern Alliance (whose "track record is not very different from the Taliban's"). She does not spare the Taliban: "Now, as adults and rulers, the Taliban beat, stone, rape, and brutalise women, they don't seem to know what else to do with them."

In the final analysis, Roy sees American-style capitalism as the culprit: 
"In America, the arms industry, the oil industry, the major media networks, and, indeed, U.S. foreign policy, are all controlled by the same business combines".

She puts the attacks on the World Trade Center and on Afghanistan on the same moral level, that of terrorism, and mourns the impossibility of beauty after 2001: "Will it be possible ever again to watch the slow, amazed blink of a newborn gecko in the sun, or whisper back to the marmot who has just whispered in your ear—without thinking of the World Trade Centre and Afghanistan?"

In May 2003 she delivered a speech titled "Instant-Mix Imperial Democracy (Buy One, Get One Free)" at Riverside Church in New York City, in which she described the United States as a global empire that reserves the right to bomb any of its subjects at any time, deriving its legitimacy directly from God. The speech was an indictment of the U.S. actions relating to the Iraq War. In June 2005 she took part in the World Tribunal on Iraq, and in March 2006 she criticised President George W. Bush's visit to India, calling him a "war criminal".

India's nuclear weaponry
In response to India's testing of nuclear weapons in Pokhran, Rajasthan, Roy wrote The End of Imagination (1998), a critique of the Indian government's nuclear policies. It was published in her collection The Cost of Living (1999), in which she also crusaded against India's massive hydroelectric dam projects in the central and western states of Maharashtra, Madhya Pradesh, and Gujarat.

Israel
In August 2006, Roy, along with Noam Chomsky, Howard Zinn and others, signed a letter in The Guardian calling the 2006 Lebanon War a "war crime" and accusing Israel of "state terror". In 2007, Roy was one of more than 100 artists and writers who signed an open letter initiated by Queers Undermining Israeli Terrorism and the South West Asian, North African Bay Area Queers calling on the San Francisco International LGBT Film Festival "to honor calls for an international boycott of Israeli political and cultural institutions, by discontinuing Israeli consulate sponsorship of the LGBT film festival and not cosponsoring events with the Israeli consulate". During the 2021 Israel–Palestine crisis, she defended Hamas's rocket attacks, citing Palestinians' right to resistance.

2001 Indian parliament attack
Roy has raised questions about the investigation into the 2001 Indian Parliament attack and the trial of the accused. According to her, Mohammad Afzal Guru was being scapegoated pointing at irregularities in the judicial and investigative process in the case and maintains the stance that the case remains unsolved. In her book about the hanging of Afzal Guru, she had even suggested that there was evidence of state complicity in the terrorist attack. In an editorial in The Hindu, journalist Praveen Swami questioned her asserted evidence of state complicity as having been "cherry-picked for polemical effect". She had also called for the death sentence of Mohammad Afzal to be stayed while a parliamentary enquiry into these questions is conducted and denounced press coverage of the trial. BJP spokesperson Prakash Javadekar criticised Roy for calling convicted terrorist Mohammad Afzal a "prisoner-of-war" and called Arundhati a "prisoner of her own dogma". Afzal was hanged in 2013.

The Muthanga incident
In 2003, the Adivasi Gothra Maha Sabha, a social movement for Adivasi land rights in Kerala, organised a major land occupation of a piece of land of a former Eucalyptus plantation in the Muthanga Wildlife Reserve, on the border of Kerala and Karnataka. After 48 days, a police force was sent into the area to evict the occupants. One participant of the movement and a policeman were killed, and the leaders of the movement were arrested. Roy travelled to the area, visited the movement's leaders in jail, and wrote an open letter to the then Chief Minister of Kerala, A. K. Antony, saying "You have blood on your hands."

Comments on 2008 Mumbai attacks
In an opinion piece for The Guardian, Roy argued that the November 2008 Mumbai attacks cannot be seen in isolation, but must be understood in the context of wider issues in the region's history and society such as widespread poverty, the Partition of India ("Britain's final, parting kick to us"), the atrocities committed during the 2002 Gujarat violence, and the ongoing Kashmir conflict. Despite this call for context, Roy stated in the article that she believes "nothing can justify terrorism" and calls terrorism "a heartless ideology". Roy warned against war with Pakistan, arguing that it is hard to "pin down the provenance of a terrorist strike and isolate it within the borders of a single nation state", and that war could lead to the "descent of the whole region into chaos". 
Her remarks were strongly criticised by Salman Rushdie and others, who condemned her for linking the Mumbai attacks with Kashmir and economic injustice against Muslims in India; Rushdie specifically criticised Roy for attacking the iconic status of the Taj Mahal Palace and Tower. Indian writer Tavleen Singh called Roy's comments "the latest of her series of hysterical diatribes against India and all things Indian".

Criticism of Sri Lankan government
In an opinion piece in The Guardian, Roy pleaded for international attention to what she called a possible government-sponsored genocide of Tamils in Sri Lanka. She cited reports of camps into which Tamils were being herded as part of what she called "a brazen, openly racist war". She also said that the "Government of Sri Lanka is on the verge of committing what could end up being genocide" and described the Sri Lankan IDP camps where Tamil civilians are being held as concentration camps. The Sri Lankan writer Ruvani Freeman called Roy's remarks "ill-informed and hypocritical" and criticised her for "whitewashing the atrocities of the LTTE". Roy has said of such accusations: "I cannot admire those whose vision can only accommodate justice for their own and not for everybody. However, I do believe that the LTTE and its fetish for violence was cultured in the crucible of monstrous, racist, injustice that the Sri Lankan government and to a great extent Sinhala society visited on the Tamil people for decades".

Views on the Naxalites
Roy has criticised the Indian government's armed actions against the Naxalite-Maoist insurgency in India, calling it "war on the poorest people in the country". According to her, the government has "abdicated its responsibility to the people" and launched the offensive against Naxals to aid the corporations with whom it has signed Memoranda of Understanding. While she has received support from various quarters for her views, Roy's description of the Maoists as "Gandhians" raised a controversy. In other statements, she has described Naxalites as patriots "of a kind" who are "fighting to implement the Constitution, (while) the government is vandalising it".

Sedition charges
In November 2010, Roy, Syed Ali Shah Geelani, and five others were brought up on charges of sedition by the Delhi Police. The filing of the First Information Report came following a directive from a local court on a petition filed by Sushil Pandit who alleged that Geelani and Roy made anti-India speeches at a conference on "Azadi-the Only Way" on 21 October 2010. In Roy's words, "Kashmir has never been an integral part of India. It is a historical fact. Even the Indian government has accepted this". A Delhi city court directed the police to respond to the demand for a criminal case after the central government declined to charge Roy, saying that the charges were inappropriate.

Criticism of Anna Hazare
On 21 August 2011, at the height of Anna Hazare's anti-corruption campaign, Roy criticised Hazare and his movement in an opinion piece published in The Hindu. In the article, she questioned Hazare's secular credentials, pointing out the campaign's corporate backing, its suspicious timing, Hazare's silence on private-sector corruption, expressing her fear that the Lokpal will only end up creating "two oligarchies, instead of just one". She stated that while "his means may be Gandhian, his demands are certainly not", and alleged that by "demonising only the Government they" are preparing to call for "more privatisation, more access to public infrastructure and India's natural resources", adding that it "may not be long before Corporate Corruption is made legal and renamed a Lobbying Fee". Roy also accused the electronic media of blowing the campaign out of proportion. In an interview with Kindle Magazine, Roy pointed out the role of media hype and target audience in determining how well hunger strikes "work as a tool of political mobilization" by noting the disparity in the attention Hazare's fast has received in contrast to the decade-long fast of Irom Sharmila "to demand the repealing of a law that allows non-commissioned officers to kill on suspicion—a law that has led to so much suffering." Roy's comparison of the Jan Lokpal Bill with the Maoists, claiming both sought "the overthrow of the Indian State", met with resentment from members of Team Anna. Medha Patkar reacted sharply calling Roy's comments "highly misplaced" and chose to emphasise the "peaceful, non-violent" nature of the movement. Roy also has stated that "an 'anti-corruption' campaign is a catch-all campaign. It includes everybody from the extreme left to the extreme right and also the extremely corrupt. No one's going to say they are for corruption after all...I'm not against a strong anti-corruption bill, but corruption is just a manifestation of a problem, not the problem itself."

Views on Narendra Modi
In 2013, Roy called Narendra Modi's nomination as prime minister a "tragedy". She said business houses were supporting his candidacy because he was the "most militaristic and aggressive" candidate. She has argued that Modi has control over India to a degree unrecognized by most people in the Western world: "He is the system. He has the backing of the media. He has the backing of the army, the courts, a majoritarian popular vote... Every institution has fallen in line." She has expressed deep despair for the future, calling Modi's long-term plans for a highly centralized Hindu state "suicidal" for the multicultural subcontinent. On 28 April 2021, The Guardian published an article by Roy describing the Indian government's response to the COVID-19 pandemic as a "crime against humanity", in which The Washington Post said Roy "slammed Modi for his handling of the pandemic". Roy's op-ed was also published in The Wire with the title "It's Not Enough to Say the Govt Has Failed. We Are Witnessing a Crime Against Humanity."

Remarks about National Registers 
On 25 December 2019, while speaking at Delhi University, Roy urged people to mislead authorities during the upcoming enumeration by the National Population Register, which she said can serve as a database for the National Register of Citizens. The remarks were criticized by the Congress and the Bharatiya Janata Party (BJP). A complaint against her was registered at Tilak Marg police station, Delhi, under sections 295A, 504, 153 and 120B of the Indian Penal Code. Roy responded, "What I was proposing was civil disobedience with a smile", and claimed her remarks were misrepresented.

Awards
Roy was awarded the 1997 Booker Prize for her novel The God of Small Things. The award carried a prize of approximately US$30,000 and a citation that noted, "The book keeps all the promises that it makes". Roy donated the prize money she received, as well as royalties from her book, to human rights causes. Prior to the Booker, Roy won the National Film Award for Best Screenplay in 1989, for the screenplay of In Which Annie Gives It Those Ones, in which she captured the anguish among the students prevailing in professional institutions. In 2015, she returned the national award in protest against religious intolerance and the growing violence by rightwing groups in India.

In 2002, she won the Lannan Foundation's Cultural Freedom Award for her work "about civil societies that are adversely affected by the world's most powerful governments and corporations", in order "to celebrate her life and her ongoing work in the struggle for freedom, justice and cultural diversity".

In 2003, she was awarded "special recognition" as a Woman of Peace at the Global Exchange Human Rights Awards in San Francisco with Bianca Jagger, Barbara Lee, and Kathy Kelly.

Roy was awarded the Sydney Peace Prize in May 2004 for her work in social campaigns and her advocacy of non-violence. That same year she was awarded the Orwell Award, along with Seymour Hersh, by the National Council of Teachers of English.

In January 2006, she was awarded the Sahitya Akademi Award, a national award from India's Academy of Letters, for her collection of essays on contemporary issues, The Algebra of Infinite Justice, but she declined to accept it "in protest against the Indian Government toeing the US line by 'violently and ruthlessly pursuing policies of brutalisation of industrial workers, increasing militarisation and economic neo-liberalisation'".

In November 2011, she was awarded the Norman Mailer Prize for Distinguished Writing.

Roy was featured in the 2014 list of Time 100, the 100 most influential people in the world.

Bibliography

Fiction

Non-fiction

See also
List of Sahitya Akademi Award winners for English
List of Indian writers
List of peace activists
Indian English literature
Naxalite–Maoist insurgency
Iraq War

References

Further reading

Books and articles on Roy

"The Politics of Design", in

Other
We, a political documentary about Roy's words. Available online.
Arundhati Roy denounces Indian democracy by Atul Cowshish, Asian Tribune, 2006-07-06 
Carreira, Shirley de S. G. "A representação da mulher em Shame, de Salman Rushdie, e O deus das pequenas coisas, de Arundathi Roy". In: MONTEIRO, Conceição & LIMA, Tereza M. de O. ed. Rio de Janeiro: Caetés, 2005
Ch'ien, Evelyn Nien-Ming, "The Politics of Design" in Weird English. Cambridge, MA: Harvard University Press, 2004; 154–199. Essay on Roy's language.

External links

SAWNET biography South Asian Women network, authors

Column archive at The Guardian

 Interviews and speeches
"Arundhati Roy" – interview by Avi Lewis on Al Jazeera Fault Lines, 2010-8-29 (video, 23 mins)
Come September –Interview with Howard Zinn, Outlook, September 2008
How Deep Shall We Dig –Full text of I.G. Khan Memorial Lecture delivered at Aligarh Muslim University on 6 April 2004, Outlook, 6 May 2004

 
1961 births
20th-century Indian essayists
20th-century Indian non-fiction writers
20th-century Indian novelists
20th-century Indian screenwriters
20th-century Indian women writers
21st-century Indian essayists
21st-century Indian non-fiction writers
21st-century Indian novelists
21st-century Indian screenwriters
21st-century Indian short story writers
21st-century Indian women writers
Activists from Kerala
Activists from Meghalaya
Anti-consumerists
Anti-globalization writers
Anti-imperialism
Anti-poverty advocates
Bengali people
Best Original Screenplay National Film Award winners
Booker Prize winners
English-language writers from India
Free speech activists
Indian activists
Indian anti-globalization activists
Indian anti–nuclear weapons activists
Indian anti-war activists
Indian environmental writers
Indian environmentalists
Indian historical novelists
Indian human rights activists
Indian non-fiction environmental writers
Indian pacifists
Indian political writers
Indian secularists
Indian social commentators
Indian social sciences writers
Indian women activists
Indian women critics
Indian women essayists
Indian women non-fiction writers
Indian women novelists
Indian women political writers
Indian women screenwriters
Indian women short story writers
Indian women television writers
Literacy and society theorists
Living people
Malayali people
Nonviolence advocates
Novelists from Kerala
Novelists from Meghalaya
Pacifist feminists
People associated with Shillong
People from Kottayam district
People from Shillong
Political activists
Postcolonial literature
Recipients of the Sahitya Akademi Award in English
School of Planning and Architecture, New Delhi alumni
Screenwriters from Kerala
Screenwriters from Meghalaya
Sustainability advocates
Theorists on Western civilization
Women writers from Kerala
Women writers from Meghalaya
Writers about activism and social change
Writers about communism
Writers about globalization
Writers about the Kashmir conflict
Writers from Kerala
Writers from Meghalaya
Writers of historical fiction set in the modern age